The 1989–90 BCAFL was the fifth full season of the British Collegiate American Football League, organised by the British Students American Football Association.

Changes from Last season
Division Changes
The Southern Conference was split into Eastern & Western Conferences

Team Changes
University of Birmingham joined the Western Conference, playing as the Lions
University of Paisley joined the Scottish Conference, playing as the Panthers
University of Sheffield joined the Northern Conference, playing as the Pirates
University of Southampton joined the Western Conference, playing as the Stags
University of Warwick joined the Eastern Conference, playing as the Wolves
This increased the number of teams in BCAFL to 16.

Regular season

Scottish Conference

Northern Conference

Eastern Conference

Western Conference

Playoffs

Note – the table does not indicate who played home or away in each fixture.

References

External links
 Official BUAFL Website
 Official BAFA Website

1989–90
1989 in British sport
1990 in British sport
1989 in American football
1990 in American football